Januke Tameike is a gravity dam located in Gifu Prefecture in Japan. The dam is used for irrigation. The catchment area of the dam is  km2. The dam impounds about 2  ha of land when full and can store 80 thousand cubic meters of water. The construction of the dam was completed in 1949.

References

Dams in Gifu Prefecture
1949 establishments in Japan